The Fo Tan Nullah is one of the nullahs of the Shing Mun River in Fo Tan, Hong Kong.

See also
List of rivers and nullahs in Hong Kong

External links

Rivers of Hong Kong, in Chinese

Sha Tin District
Fo Tan
Rivers of Hong Kong